"Hold Me Closer" is a song by English singer Elton John and American singer Britney Spears. It was released as a single on 26 August 2022, through EMI. The song combines elements from John's songs "Tiny Dancer" (1971), "The One" (1992), and "Don't Go Breaking My Heart" (1976). It appears on the digital reissue of John's collaborative album The Lockdown Sessions (2021).

The song had a polarised critical reception while achieving commercial success upon release. It first debuted at number one on the ARIA Charts. The track subsequently debuted at number three on the UK Singles Chart, becoming Spears' 24th top-ten single and highest-charting song since "Scream & Shout" (2012), while earning John his 35th top-ten single. On the Billboard Hot 100, "Hold Me Closer" debuted at number six.

Background and release

News about a collaboration between the two artists first broke in late July 2022. On 8 August, John confirmed the collaboration, calling it a remake of his 1972 single "Tiny Dancer". He also released a promotional artwork featuring the song's title and a rose and rocket emojireferencing Spears' regular use of the former on social media as well as her "Project 1 Rose" selfie montage, and John's popular nickname "Rocket Man"as well as shared the song's pre-save link. On 19 August, the single was officially announced, along with its release date. On 22 August, John shared a snippet of the song on his social media. He also performed a snippet of the song at the restaurant "La Guérite" in Cannes, on 23 August, in front of diners as a surprise, which he livestreamed on his social media. The following day, Spears posted a snippet of the song on her social media, revealing a new rendition of John's 1992 single "The One" in the duet, and thanked him for having her on the record. That same day, John released an animated teaser for the song's audio visualiser. Ahead of the song's release, Spears described it as "a big deal" and "pretty damn cool [to be] singing with one of the most classic men of our time". She revealed that she felt "overwhelmed". Spears reportedly completed recording her vocals for the song in less than two hours. The duet also interpolates John's 1976 single "Don't Go Breaking My Heart". The single marks Spears' first musical release since "Matches" (2020) as well as her return to music after the termination of her conservatorship. John revealed that his husband, David Furnish, first suggested him to collaborate with Spears on the song, while also saying he believed the project would "boost" her confidence after a "traumatic time". Record producer Andrew Watt praised Spears' dedication towards the project despite of her musical hiatus, saying she "was so prepared. She had spent time with the record and knew how she wanted to do it." He further said the song "meant so much to her, and you can hear it in her vocal performance. She's singing her ass off."

The single's artwork was unveiled on 19 August, with the song's official announcement. It depicts both artists as children, with Spears in a ballet costume and John sitting at a piano. The Evening Standard Elizabeth Gregory thought that the artwork "points towards a desired spirit of innocence and freedom."

"Hold Me Closer" was released on 26 August to digital download formats and online stores, and streaming platforms. with an animated audio visual being uploaded to John's YouTube channel. The single was also sent for radio airplay in Italy by Universal Music that same day. On 29 August, it was serviced to adult contemporary radio and its hot AC and modern AC sub-formats, in the United States by Interscope Records. The song further impacted contemporary hit radio in the U.S. via Interscope, the following day.

An animated lyric video for the song featuring a CGI rocket flying in the air while ejecting roses, was released on 6 September 2022.

Critical reception
Upon release, "Hold Me Closer" had a polarised reception from music critics and fans. The Guardian Michael Cragg rated the song four out of five stars, praising Spears' "engaged delivery coating the ghostly shimmers of John's original vocals". He further wrote: "Both 'The One', which makes up the verses, and 'Tiny Dancer' evoke a sense of having found someone, or something, with the power to transform a life. A totem to hold on to and believe in. On 'Hold Me Closer', Spears seems to hint at finding that for herself again in music." Mary Siroki of Consequence called the song "dreamy and delightful", saying that it "strikes as an instant-classic because, in the literal sense, it already is — we all know the melody and the key lyrics by heart, but the new contributions from Spears provide a present-day spin that gives a new life to the original tune." According to Robin Murray of Clash, the track is "a neat, astute, carefully finessed piece of pop music". Billboard Stephen Daw opined that the "dance floor-ready production" make the song "an excellent jam worthy of the icons performing it", and highlighted Spears's vocals as "phenomenal". In the Evening Standard, Elizabeth Gregory found it "an emotional summer-end hit", which is "defiant in its breeziness. There's an undercurrent of sadness but here the good times triumph." Mikael Wood of the Los Angeles Times  described it as "a bop, a banger, a vibe. [...] That you can’t really tell their voices apart thanks to the buckets of Auto-Tune only makes their pairing that much sweeter." 

Calling it "one of the most pointless records in pop history", The Daily Telegraph Neil McCormick rated the song one out of five stars, saying that it misses "Britney's signature sass and with her vocals barely audible, this horrible mash-up of two Elton songs is a baffling 'comeback'." He also compared the song unfavourably to John's duet with Dua Lipa, "Cold Heart (Pnau remix)" (2021), which also mashed up older songs by John, thinking that "lightning has not struck twice". In another one-star review, Will Hodgkinson of The Times thought that "Hold Me Closer" was "a massive opportunity wasted", where "all the soul has been stripped away" from John's "Tiny Dancer" and "John and Spears's voices have been treated in a way that makes them sound like they might dissolve into the background entirely". Ed Power of The Irish Times also deemed it "a missed opportunity" which "sounds like dance-floor fodder from a regional nightclub circa 1997", while finding Spears' "vocals so low in the mix that you have to check twice to confirm she's there. Britney is the ghost haunting her own comeback." Chloe Stilwell on Mic opined that the track "isn't necessarily bad", but "leaves a lot to be desired", saying that "putting 'Tiny Dancer' through an autotune car wash wasn't what we needed. That's probably the biggest problem with the song: it's so edited that John and Spears both sound like robots, and using that effect on such a classic song comes across as jarring and lazy." For The A.V. Club Gabrielle Sanchez, "Hold Me Closer" is "a tepid offering that fails to utilize everything Spears brings to the table as a pop star", nevertheless she noted that it "serves as a triumphant victory lap regarding the end of her lengthy conservatorship".

Commercial performance
"Hold Me Closer" was met with commercial success upon release. It debuted at number three on the UK Singles Chart on the week ending 2 September 2022, becoming Spears' 24th top-ten single and highest-charting song since "Scream & Shout" (2012), while earning John his 35th top-ten single. As of 31 August 2022, "Hold Me Closer" has sold 22,295 copies in the United Kingdom. In November 2022, it was certified silver by the British Phonographic Industry (BPI) for track-equivalent sales of 200,000 units.

In Australia, the song debuted at number one, becoming Spears' first number-one single in the country since "Everytime" (2004), as well as her sixth overall, and it marked John's fifth number-one single on the chart.

On 6 September 2022, the song debuted at number six on the US Billboard Hot 100 chart, becoming Spears' 14th top-ten hit on the chart, as well as John's 29th. With this, Spears became the 12th artist to have top-ten hits in four decades (1990s, 2000s, 2010s, and 2020s). The single debuted at number one on the Billboard Hot Dance/Electronic Songs chart, becoming the third song in the history of the chart to do so. It managed to sell 48,000 copies in its first week of release, followed by another 11,000 copies in its second week of release.

Music videos
News about a potential music video for the song broke out shortly after its release. John confirmed the news in late September 2022, sharing a snippet of the opening scene of the video on his social mediaas a preview ahead of its release. 

The original music video for "Hold Me Closer" premiered via John's Vevo channel on YouTube on 27 September 2022, and was also uploaded to his platform the same day. It was directed by Ukrainian music video director Tanu Muino, who called her experience in directing the video an "emotional" moment; she grew up listening to both artists. She further said that the music video of Spears' 2001 single "I'm a Slave 4 U" inspired her to become a music video director. A second music video was released for the English DJ Joel Corry remix of the song on  23 October 2022. It was directed by Rebekah Creative and produced by Greatcoat Films. On 18 November 2022, a third music video was released for the acoustic version of "Hold Me Closer". It was directed by Tristan Nash and features American ice skater Nathan Chen.

Accolades

Track listings
 Digital download and streaming
"Hold Me Closer" – 3:22

 Digital download (Joel Corry remix)
"Hold Me Closer" (Joel Corry remix) – 4:08

 Streaming (Joel Corry remix)
"Hold Me Closer" (Joel Corry remix) – 4:08
"Hold Me Closer" – 3:22

 Digital download (Purple Disco Machine remix)
"Hold Me Closer" (Purple Disco Machine remix) – 3:38
"Hold Me Closer" (Purple Disco Machine extended mix) – 5:54

 Streaming (Purple Disco Machine remix)
"Hold Me Closer" (Purple Disco Machine remix) – 3:38
"Hold Me Closer" (Purple Disco Machine extended mix) – 5:54
"Hold Me Closer" – 3:22

 Digital download (Pink Panda remix)
"Hold Me Closer" (Pink Panda remix) – 3:01
"Hold Me Closer" (Pink Panda extended mix) – 3:52

 Streaming (Pink Panda remix)
"Hold Me Closer" (Pink Panda remix) – 3:01
"Hold Me Closer" (Pink Panda extended mix) – 3:52
"Hold Me Closer" – 3:22

 Digital download (acoustic)
"Hold Me Closer" (acoustic) – 3:22

 Streaming (acoustic)
"Hold Me Closer" (acoustic) – 3:22
"Hold Me Closer" – 3:22

Credits and personnel
 Elton John – vocals, songwriting, piano, keyboards
 Britney Spears – vocals
 Bernie Taupin – songwriting
 Andrew Watt – keyboards, bass guitar, guitar, drums, songwriting
 Cirkut – keyboards, programming, songwriting
 Randy Merrill – mastering
 Şerban Ghenea – mixing
 Bryce Bordone – assistant mixer
 Paul LaMalfa – recording engineer

Charts

Weekly charts

Monthly charts

Year-end charts

Certifications

Release history

References

2022 songs
2022 singles
Britney Spears songs
Elton John songs
EMI Records singles
Mashup songs
Mercury Records singles
Number-one singles in Australia
Number-one singles in Hungary
Number-one singles in Israel
Songs written by Andrew Watt (record producer)
Songs written by Cirkut (record producer)
Songs with music by Elton John
Songs with lyrics by Bernie Taupin